Sankranti Bazar is a village development committee in the Himalayas of Terhathum District in the Kosi Zone of eastern Nepal. At the time of the 1991 Nepal census it had a population of 3266 people living in 622 individual households. Once a thriving market town, By 2001 the village had declined because road construction had bypassed them and because of Maoist activity.

References

External links
UN map of the municipalities of Terhathum District
Terhathum documentary, Sankranti (Video)

Populated places in Tehrathum District